In mathematics, progressive measurability is a property in the theory of stochastic processes. A progressively measurable process, while defined quite technically, is important because it implies the stopped process is measurable. Being progressively measurable is a strictly stronger property than the notion of being an adapted process. Progressively measurable processes are important in the theory of Itô integrals.

Definition
Let
  be a probability space;
  be a measurable space, the state space;
  be a filtration of the sigma algebra ;
  be a stochastic process (the index set could be  or  instead of );

This implies that  is -adapted.

Properties
 It can be shown that , the space of stochastic processes  for which the Itô integral
 
 Every adapted process with left- or right-continuous paths is progressively measurable. Consequently, every adapted process with càdlàg paths is progressively measurable.
 Every measurable and adapted process has a progressively measurable modification.

References

Stochastic processes
Measure theory